The San Marino Davis Cup team represents San Marino in Davis Cup tennis competition and are governed by the San Marino Tennis Federation.

San Marino currently compete in the Group IV of Europe Zone and has never been promoted to the second group.

As of 2022, Domenico Vicini holds the all-time record for the number of Davis Cup rubbers played, at 141.

History
San Marino competed in its first Davis Cup in 1993.

Current team (2022)

 Marco de Rossi
 Stefano Galvani
 Simone de Luigi (Junior player)
 Domenico Vicini (Captain-player)

See also

San Marino Fed Cup team

References

External links

Davis Cup teams
Davis Cup
Davis Cup